Lepp Hollow is a valley in Warren County in the U.S. state of Missouri.

Lepp Hollow has the name of the Lepp family, original owners of the site.

References

Valleys of Warren County, Missouri
Valleys of Missouri